is a standard phrase used in Japanese poetry to signify a journey. 
It may also refer to:

 Kusamakura (novel), a Japanese novel by Natsume Sōseki
 Kusamakura (album), a compilation album by Italian singer Alice

Japanese poetry
Japanese literary terminology